The Battle of Versinikia was fought in 813 between the Byzantine Empire and the Bulgarian Empire, near the city of Adrianople (Edirne) in what is now modern-day Turkey.

The Bulgarian army, led by Krum had an army about half the size of the Byzantine army. The Bulgarian army was victorious, which lead to the dethroning of Byzantine Emperor Michael I Rangabe (811–813) by Leo V the Armenian. The battle further strengthened the Bulgarian position after their victory over Nicephorus I two years earlier. After the battle they took de facto control of the whole region  of Eastern Thrace (until the Byzantine–Bulgarian Treaty of 815) with the exception of a few castles that remained in Byzantine control. For the first time in Bulgarian history, it was possible to march on Constantinople. Krum died at the height of the preparation for the final siege of the Byzantine capital on the 13th of April 814.

Prelude
After the Bulgarians' victory over the Byzantine army of Emperor Nicephorus I in the battle of Pliska in 811, the Byzantine Empire found itself in a difficult situation. Nicephorus' son (and legitimate heir) Staurakios, who was wounded in the battle, was deposed in the autumn of the same year, after a palace coup d’état. Michael I Rangabe, curopalates (supervisor of the palace) during the reign of Nicephorus I, was proclaimed emperor.

Bulgaria, which had also suffered heavy losses and great material damage during Nicephorus' campaign, reorganized its army and resources and was not able to advance until the next year. The Bulgarian attacks were concentrated mainly in Thrace, and also along the valley of the Strymōn (Struma) River. Many towns were seized and their population was sent far to the north to “Bulgaria across the Danube”. The attack created such panic among the Byzantine population that several towns were emptied even without being attacked by the Bulgarians. The attempts of Michael I to resist were fruitless – he organized an army but soon after he set off from Constantinople as he had to go back due to a conspiracy.

In the meantime, the Bulgarians continued to strike Thrace, but in the autumn of 812 they were offered peace. The Bulgarian delegation was led by Dobromir, although the Byzantine Emperor refused to conclude the peace deal due to "his foul advisors' suggestions". The real reason was, most likely, item three in the Byzantine–Bulgarian Treaty of 716 which stated that "The refugees [emigrants, deserters] from both sides shall be mutually surrendered, if they are plotting against the authorities." That item was important for the Byzantines during the 8th century because the authority of their former Emperors was weakened and, after the crisis in Bulgaria in the mid 8th century, it had become inconvenient for them. In response to the refusal, the Bulgarians besieged Mesembria (Nessebar). They had siege machines built by an Arab emigrant and soon captured the town, where they found 36 copper siphons used to throw Greek fire and a large quantity of gold and silver.

Preparations 
Despite the loss of Mesembria, the Byzantines did not agree to a settlement. During the winter of 812–813 Khan Krum began intense preparations for an attack against Byzantium, while Michael I was preparing for defense. In February 813 Bulgarian forces made several investigation raids in Thrace but quickly pulled back after several clashes with the Byzantines. The retreat was considered by the Byzantine Emperor as a victory "according to God's providence" and encouraged him to counter-attack.

The Byzantines again summoned an enormous army gathered from all themes of their empire,  including the guards of the Syrian passes. Due to unrest in the army, the campaign was delayed but left from Constantinople in May. The departure was a celebration and the population of the city, including the Empress, accompanied the troops outside the city wall. They gave presents to the military commanders and invoked them to guard the Emperor and fight for the Christians.

Battle

The Byzantine army marched to the North, but did not try to take back Mesembria. On the 4th of May there was a solar eclipse which frightened the Byzantine soldiers, lowering their morale. They encamped in the vicinity of Adrianople, where the army looted and robbed its own country. In May, Khan Krum also went to Adrianople. In June both armies set their camps close to each other near the small fortress of Versinikia to the north of Adrianople. John Skylitzes, in Synopsis Historian, stated that the Byzantine army was 10 times larger than the Bulgarian hosts. Therefore, the Bulgarians maintained a defensive position. Despite their numerical, logistical, and strategic superiority, the Byzantine army did not confront the adversary. Both armies waited for thirteen days in the Thracian summer. Eventually, the Byzantine commanders decided to go on the offensive. Some of them were eager to attack and on the 22th of June, the strategos of Macedonia, named John Aplakes, addressed Michael and said: "How much are we going to wait and die? I will attack first in the name of God and you will follow me bravely. And victory shall be ours because we are ten times more than them [the Bulgarians]."

The battle was short: in the morning of the same day the Byzantines decided to attack the right Byzantine flank under Aplakes engaged the Bulgarians’ left. It managed to inflict casualties to the Bulgarian left flank and push it back, but the Byzantine center and left did not engage in the battle, thus leaving Aplakes’ attack unsupported. When Krum saw the inaction among the Byzantine center and left he took action. Krum ordered a second line of Slavic infantry to engage Aplakes' contingent while a unit of Bulgar horse archers and heavy cavalry attacked both flanks of Aplakes' contingent. The Anatolian theme was the first to withdraw, followed by the entire army. The soldiers of Aplakes were left behind and most of them perished, including their commander. When the Bulgarians saw that the enemy, which had been in the higher positions, was retreating, they suspected a trap at first. They also did not expect to achieve success and thus did not chase them at first. But when the Bulgarians were certain that the enemy was fleeing, their heavy cavalry rushed after the Byzantines. Some of them perished during the flight; others hid in different fortresses, some of which were taken by the Bulgarians, and the rest managed to reach Constantinople. The chief commanders of the Byzantine army, including the Emperor Michael I Rangabe and Leo the Armenian, were the first to retreat from the battlefield. The Bulgarians took the Byzantine camp and a rich prize of gold and weaponry.

Later Byzantine chronographers Genesius and Theophanes Continuatus accused Leo the Armenian of being primarily responsible for the defeat, claiming that he deliberately ordered the flight of the units that were still not engaged in the battle. This view is accepted by a large number of scholars (J.B. Bury, Steven Runciman, George Ostrogorsky, R.J.H. Jenkins, Warren Treadgold, etc.), while others like Vasil Zlatarski and a number of Greek scholars, reject Leo's responsibility, pointing to an alternative story that Genesius and Theophanes Continuatus were also included in their texts.

Aftermath
The victory at Versinikia further worsened the situation of Byzantium and gave the Bulgarian Khan an opportunity to launch attacks in the vicinity of the Byzantine capital itself. It also sealed the fate of Michael I Rangabe who was forced to abdicate and withdraw to a monastery. The Byzantine throne was taken by Leo V the Armenian (813–820) who was distinguished from his predecessor as a strong-charactered and energetic man. He immediately took hasty precautions for the defense of Constantinople because he expected a Bulgarian assault.

The way to Constantinople was clear and the Bulgarian army headed to the city without resistance. There were still several fortresses in Thrace which remained in Byzantine hands, particularly Adrianople which was besieged by Krum's brother. On the 17th of July in 813 Krum himself reached the walls of Constantinople and set his camp without hindrance. Within sight of the citizens of Constantinople, Krum who was also the high priest, made a sacrifice to the Bulgar god Tangra, performed some pagan rituals, built trenches along the city's walls, and offered peace.

Leo V agreed to negotiations, but he intended to kill Khan Krum and eliminate the threat over the Byzantine Empire. During the negotiations, the Byzantines fired arrows on the Bulgarian delegation. This killed some of them, including the kavkhan and other high officials, but Krum himself remained unscathed.

Infuriated by the treachery of the Byzantines, Krum ordered all churches, monasteries, and palaces outside Constantinople to be destroyed, the captured Byzantines were slain and the riches from the palaces were sent to Bulgaria on carts. Next, enemy fortresses in the surroundings of Constantinople and Marmara Sea were seized and razed to the ground. The castles and settlements in the hinterland of Eastern Thrace were looted and the whole region devastated. Krum later returned to Adrianople and strengthened the besieging forces. With the help of mangonels and battering rams he forced the city to surrender. The Bulgarians captured 10,000 people who were resettled in Bulgaria across the Danube. A further 50,000 from other settlements in Thrace were deported there. During the winter, Krum returned to Bulgaria and launched serious preparation for the final assault on Constantinople. The siege machines had to be transported to Constantinople by 5,000 iron-covered carts hauled by 10,000 oxen. However, he died during the height of the preparations on 13 April 814.

Location of the battle 
The exact location of the Versinikia fortress is unknown. According to Theophanes, the castle was located 60km (around 37.3 mi) from Michael Rangabe's camp at Adrianople. At that distance to the north is located the village of Malomirovo in whose surrounding was discovered an ancient Bulgarian inscription from the reign of Khan Krum. It is about the division of the Bulgarian army during the campaign in 813 – the left flank under kavkhan Irtais was concentrated on the coast at Anchialus (Pomorie) and Sozopol and the right flank's headquarters were in the area of Beroe

(Stara Zagora) under the command of the ichirgu-boil Tuk. The center under the personal command of Krum was probably located in the area of contemporary town of Elhovo which is close to Malamirovo. It is likely that the Byzantine army took position along the Derventski Heights, which are situated on the contemporary Bulgarian-Turkish border.

References

Citations

Sources 

 Theophanes the Confessor, Chronicle, Ed. Carl de Boor, Leipzig.
 Theophanes Continuatus, Chronographia, in Patrologia Graeca vol. 109, ed. J. P. Migne, Paris 1863.
 Josephus Genesius, Vasiliai (Historia de Rebus Constantinopolitanis), in Patrologia Graeca vol. 109, ed. J.P. Migne, Paris 1863. This work is also known as Reges.
 John Skylitzes, Synopsis Historion, translated by Paul Stephenson.
 Васил Н. Златарски (Vasil N. Zlatarski), История на българската държава през средните векове, Част I, II изд., Наука и изкуство, София 1970.
 Атанас Пейчев и колектив, 1300 години на стража, Военно издателство, София 1984.
 Йордан Андреев, Милчо Лалков, Българските ханове и царе, Велико Търново, 1996.
 Θεόδωρος Κορρές, Λέων Ε' ο Αρμένιος και η εποχή του – Μια κρίσιμη δεκαετία για το Βυζάντιο (811–820), εκδ. Βάνιας, Θεσσαλονίκη 1996.
 John Haldon, The Byzantine Wars, Tempus, 2001. .
 
 
 Warren Treadgold, A history of the Byzantine State and Society, Stanford University Press 1997, .
 Battle of Versinikia

813
810s conflicts
810s in the Byzantine Empire
9th century in Bulgaria
Battles involving the First Bulgarian Empire
Versinikia
Battles of the Middle Ages